The Battle of Peshawar took place on May 6, 1834, between the Sikh Empire and the Peshawar Sardars, who was ruled by Sultan Mohammad Khan after being deposed by his brother, Dost Mohammad Khan, from his rule in Kabul.
Following the collapse of the Durrani Empire, Afghanistan split into many different states to where virtually every city was autonomous or independent in some shape or form, with states like the Principality of Qandahar and the Emirate of Herat being formed. Maharaj Ranjit Singh sent General Hari Singh Nalwa and Mahan Singh Mirpuri as Nalwa's deputy commander to capture Peshawar. After brief fighting, Hari Singh Nalwa captured the city. The news of the capture of Peshawar quickly reached Kabul. Learning of his deposed brothers defeat. Hari Singh Nalwa was appointed as governor of the city by Maharaja Ranjit Singh.

References

Peshawar 1834
1834 in India
1834
Peshawar 1834
Peshawar 1834
Ranjit Singh
1834 in Afghanistan
May 1834 events